David Frisch may refer to:

 David Frisch (American football) (born 1970), American football tight end
 David H. Frisch (1918–1991), physicist
 David Meir Frisch, 19th-century rabbinical authority